The 2011–12 Fogo Island League season began on 19 November and finished on 22 April.  Académica do Fogo won their 11th title and qualified into the 2012 Cape Verdean Football Championships.  The championship was organized by the Fogo Regional Football Association (Associação Regional de Futebol do Fogo, ARFF).

Vulcânicos was the defending team of the title. A total of 18 clubs participated in the competition, 10 in the Premier Division and 8 in the Second.

Competing Teams

Premier Division
Académica do Fogo
Baxada
Botafogo (also as Bota Fogo)
Cutelinho FC
Juventude do Fogo
Luzabril
Nô Pintcha dos Mosteiros
Spartak d'Aguadinha
Valência do Fogo
Vulcânicos

Second Division
ABC de Patim
Brasilim
Esperança de Achada Furna
Grito Povo (or Gritu Povu) - Ribeira do Ilhéu
Nova Era FC - Terra Branca subdivision, São Filipe
Parque Real - Cova Figueira
União de São Lourenço

Table

Premier Division

Second Division
1st: Grito Povo

Results

Week 1
19 November 2011
Luzabril 1-1 Cutelinho
Spartak 2-0 Juventude
20 November 2011
Baxada 0-3 Vulcânico
Académica 2-1 Valência
Nô Pintcha 0-1 Botafogo

Week 2
26 November 2011
Valėncia 3-0 Nô Pintcha
Botafogo 3-0 Baxada - Baxada did not show up
27 November 2011
Juventude 1-5 Académica
Luzabril 0-3 Vulcânico
Cutelinho 1-0 Spartak

Week 3
3 December 2011
Académica 7-0 Baxada - Baxada abandoned at 75', result stood
Vulcânico 3-2 Cutelinho
4 December 2011
Luzabril1-3 Botafogo
Spartak 2-0 Valência
Nô Pintcha 7-3 Juventude

Week 4
10 December 2011
Baxada 0-3 Spartak
Luzabril 0-0 Valência
Cutelinho 3-1 Botafogo
11 December 2011
Académica 1-1 Nô Pintcha
Juventude 0-1 Vulcânico

Week 5
17 December 2011
Botafogo 4-2 Juventude
Académica 3-0 Luzabril
Nô Pintcha 5-2 Baxada
18 December 2011
Vulcânico 2-1 Spartak
Valência 3-0 Cutelinho

Week 6
7 January 2012
Valência 3-1 Baxada
Luzabril 0-4 Nô Pintcha
8 January 2012
Spartak 2-4 Botafogo
Vulcânico 0-2 Académica
Cutelinho 4-1 Juventude

Week 7
14 January 2012
Académica 2-1 Cutelinho
Vulcânico 0-0 Botafogo
15 January 2012
Juventude 0-0 Valência
Baxada 5-0 Luzabril
Nô Pintcha 2-2 Spartak

Week 8
28 January 2012
Cutelinho 4-2 Baxada
4 February 2012
Luzabril 1-2 Juventude
Académica 1-1 Spartak
29 January
Botafogo 3-0 Valěncia
Vulcânico 1-2 Nô Pintcha

Week 9
11 February 2012
Spartak 4-1 Luzabril
Valência 1-2 Vulcânico
Nô Pintcha 0-0 Cutelinho
12 February 2012
Académica 2-1 Botafogo
Juventude 0-0 Baxada

Week 10
18 February 2012
Botafogo 3-0 Nô Pintcha
Juventude 2-1 Spartak
Cutelinho 2-0 Luzabril
19 February 2012
Vulcânico 2-1 Baxada
Valėncia 1-2 Académica

Week 11
3 March 2012
Spartak 4-3 Cutelinho
Baxada 0-1 Botafogo
Nô Pintcha 1-0 Valência
4 March 2012
Académica 0-1 Juventude
Vulcânico 1-0 Luzabril

Week 12
10 March 2012
Baxada 1-3 Académica
Juventude 1-1 Nô Pintcha
11 March 2012
Botafogo 5-0 Luzabril
Valência 1-0 Spartak
Cutelinho 0-1 Vulcânico

Week 13
17 March 2012
Spartak 5-0 Baxada
Valência 2-1 Luzabril
Nô Pintcha 1-2 Académica
18 March 2012
Botafogo 3-0 Cutelinho
Vulcânico 2-0 Juventude

Week 14
24 March 2012
Juventude 0-5 Botafogo
Luzabril 1-2 Académica
25 March 2012
Baxada 0-1 Nô Pintcha
Spartak 1-3 Vulcânicos
Cutelinho 2-2 Valência

Week 15
31 March 2012
Baxada 0-3 Valência (awarded as Baxada did not show up)
Juventude 0-4 Cutelinho
Nô Pintcha 4-2 Luzabril
1 April 2012
Botafogo 2-2 Spartak
Académica 0-1 Vulcânico

Week 16
7 April 2012
Spartak 1-1 Nô Pintcha
Botafogo 0-1 Vulcânico
8 April 2012
Cutelinho 2-3 Académica
Valência 3-1 Juventude
Luzabril 3-1 Baxada

Week 17
14 April 2012
Juventude 0-3 Luzabril
Spartak 0-2 Académica
Nô Pintcha 2-4 Vulcânico
15 April 2012
Baxada 0-3 Cutelinho (awarded as Baxada did not show up)
Valěncia 6-1 Botafogo

Week 18
21 April 2012
Luzabril 1-4 Spartak
Vulcânico 0-0 Valência
Cutelinho 1-1 Nô Pintcha
22 April 2012
Botafogo 1-2 Académica
Baxada 0-3 Juventude (awarded as Baxada did not show up)

Position changes

References

External links
*
2011-12 Fogo Premier Division

Fogo football seasons
2011–12 in Cape Verdean football